Devery Karz (born February 18, 1988) is an American rower. She competed in the women's lightweight double sculls event at the 2016 Summer Olympics.

References

External links
 

1988 births
Living people
American female rowers
Olympic rowers of the United States
Rowers at the 2016 Summer Olympics
Place of birth missing (living people)
21st-century American women